Daniel or Danny McBride may refer to:
 Danny McBride (born 1976), American actor, writer, and comedian
 Danny McBride (writer), American screenwriter and actor
 Danny McBride (musician) (1945–2009), American singer-songwriter and guitarist
 Daniel McBride, better known as Sheep, Dog & Wolf, New Zealand musician